Palermo is an Italian surname.  Notable people with the name include:

Blinky Palermo (1943–1977), pseudonym of the German artist Peter Heisterkamp
Brian Palermo, American actor and comedian, and science communicator
Gianpiero D. Palermo
Girolamo Palermo, American mobster
John Palermo (born 1952)
Johnny Palermo (1982–2009), American actor
Martín Palermo (born 1973), Argentine soccer coach and retired player
Olivia Palermo (born 1986)
Steve Palermo (1949–2017)
Tony Palermo (born 1979)
Vincent Palermo (born 1944), American mobster

Italian-language surnames